Moose Pass is a census-designated place (CDP) in Kenai Peninsula Borough, Alaska, United States. The population was 219 at the 2010 census, up from 206 in 2000.

Geography
Moose Pass is located in the north-central part of the Kenai Peninsula at  (60.487778, -149.370833). It is bordered to the south by Crown Point.

Climate
Moose Pass has a dry-summer continental subarctic climate (Köppen Dsc).

Demographics

Moose Pass first reported on the 1940 U.S. Census as an unincorporated village. It was made a census-designated place (CDP) in 1980.
 
As of the census of 2000, there were 206 people, 84 households, and 51 families residing in the CDP.  The population density was 11.4 people per square mile (4.4/km2).  There were 119 housing units at an average density of 6.6/sq mi (2.5/km2).  The racial makeup of the CDP was 87.38% White, 1.46% Black or African American, 5.83% Native American, and 5.34% from two or more races.  Hispanic or Latino of any race were 0.49% of the population.

There were 84 households, out of which 32.1% had children under the age of 18 living with them, 53.6% were married couples living together, 4.8% had a female householder with no husband present, and 38.1% were non-families. 31.0% of all households were made up of individuals, and 4.8% had someone living alone who was 65 years of age or older.  The average household size was 2.45 and the average family size was 3.13.

In the CDP, the population was spread out, with 29.1% under the age of 18, 5.3% from 18 to 24, 35.0% from 25 to 44, 25.2% from 45 to 64, and 5.3% who were 65 years of age or older.  The median age was 36 years. For every 100 females there were 151.2 males.  For every 100 females age 18 and over, there were 139.3 males.

The median income for a household in the CDP was $87,291, and the median income for a family was $85,463. Males had a median income of $61,563 versus $31,563 for females. The per capita income for the CDP was $28,147.  None of the families and none of the population were living below the poverty line.

References

External links

Moose Pass Chamber of Commerce

Census-designated places in Kenai Peninsula Borough, Alaska
Kenai Mountains-Turnagain Arm National Heritage Area